Jean Mascart (Paris, 7 March 1872 — Paris, 28 March 1935) was a French astronomer and mathematician.

Career 
Mascart was on the staff of the Paris observatory.

On 17 May 1910, Mascart was at Tenerife to observe Halley's Comet from the southern flank of Pico de Teide.

Works

Sources and references 
 Notes

Citations

References

20th-century French astronomers
Scientists from Paris